The men's freestyle 85 kilograms is a competition featured at the 2001 World Wrestling Championships, and was held at the Winter Sports Palace in Sofia, Bulgaria from 23 to 25 November 2001.

Medalists

Results

Preliminary round

Pool 1

Pool 2

Pool 3

Pool 4

Pool 5

Pool 6

Pool 7

Pool 8

Knockout round

References

Men's freestyle 85 kg